Muhammad Daud Khan Achakzai (Urdu: محمد داؤد خان اچکزئی) is a Pakistani Senator from Baluchistan.

Political career
He belongs to Baluchistan province. In March 2012 he was elected to the Senate of Pakistan on general seat as Awami National Party (ANP) candidate. He is the chairperson of senate committee on communication and member of Senate Committee on Information, Broadcasting and National Heritage, Law and Justice, Defence Production, Select Committee.

See also
 List of Senators of Pakistan
 Ayatullah Durrani
 Abdul Haseeb Khan

References

External links
Awami National Party Official Site

Politicians from Quetta
Living people
Pashtun people
Awami National Party politicians
Pakistani senators (14th Parliament)
1978 births